The 1984 South Australian National Football League season was the 105th season of the top-level Australian rules football competition in South Australia.

Norwood finished 5th on the ladder but won all four of its finals, to win the premiership. They became the first SANFL team to win the premiership from 5th, and the first to win from the Elimination Final.

Ladder

Grand final

References 

SANFL
South Australian National Football League seasons